Zach Tuohy (born 10 December 1989) is an Irish professional Australian rules footballer playing for the Geelong Football Club in the Australian Football League (AFL). 

Tuohy grew up in Portlaoise, County Laois, Ireland, and played Gaelic football before making a code switch to Australian rules football. He is regarded as one of the greatest Irish players in the history of the AFL with the second highest number of games played, the most of any current non-Australian born player and fifth most in history.

In 2022, he and Mark O'Connor (from Kerry) became the second and third Irish players in AFL history to win a premiership by winning the 2022 AFL Grand Final with the Geelong Cats. Tadhg Kennelly won the first for Ireland in 2005 with the Sydney Swans.

Gaelic football
Tuohy began his sporting career as a Gaelic footballer at the Portlaoise club, and became a regular in underage Laois county sides. He won a Leinster Minor Football Championship with them in 2007.

Tuohy represented Ireland in International rules football in the 2011, 2013 and 2017 series. He scored a goal in the first Test in 2013 at Breffni Park.

Australian football

Carlton
Tuohy attracted the attention of Australian rules football recruiters from the Carlton Football Club in the AFL, a club based in the inner city of Melbourne. During 2009, Tuohy travelled to Melbourne to undergo a four-week trial with the club, which was sufficiently impressed to offer Tuohy an International Rookie contract. This contract ensured Tuohy would be recruited by Carlton; he was then selected with the club's sixth round selection in the 2010 AFL rookie draft (No. 73 overall) as a formality. Tuohy became the fourth Irish player to spend time on the Carlton list, and was only the second to play a senior game.

Tuohy began the 2010 season playing in Carlton's , the Northern Bullants. He developed as a tagger, and then as a rebounding half-back. He was temporarily elevated to the senior list in place of the injured Luke Mitchell in early 2011, and he made his AFL debut in Round 11 against , going on to play eleven games for the season. By 2012, he was a regular in the Carlton team and, in 2013, he played in every match, finishing seventh in the club, best and fairest award, the John Nicholls Medal. Over time, Tuohy became noted for his long, accurate kicking, and regularly drifted from the backline to half-forward to kick long goals from beyond the 50m line. He had shown a similar aptitude for long-range kicking in Gaelic football, in which he was his county's designated kicker for 45m plus free kicks.

Tuohy had a strong season in 2015, running third in the John Nicholls Medal count, and being selected as the small defender in the 2015 AFL Coaches Association All-Australian team, by polling the most votes of any small defender in the AFL Coaches Association MVP award. He played his 100th game in early 2016, becoming only the fifth Irish player in the league to reach that milestone.

Geelong
At the conclusion of the 2016 season, Tuohy requested a trade from Carlton and nominated  as his preferred destination. He was officially traded to Geelong in October.

On 21 July 2018, Tuohy took a contested mark with 10 seconds of play remaining and then kicked a goal after the siren to secure Geelong a two-point victory against Melbourne. He played his 200th game against Richmond on 11 September 2020, becoming just the second-ever Irish AFL player to reach that milestone, being preceded by Jim Stynes. Tuohy played his 250th game in the 2022 Grand Final, also winning his first premiership.

He and Mark O'Connor became only the second and third Irish players to win an AFL premiership, following Tadhg Kennelly in 2005.

In October 2022, Tuohy signed a new one-year contract extension with Geelong.

Personal life
Tuohy's father Noel was a member of Laois County Council and ran in the 2020 Irish general election.

Tuohy intends to marry his partner, Rebecca Price, in Ireland at the end of 2022. He is involved in business in Portlaoise, including a coffee shop.

Statistics
Updated to the end of the 2022 season.

|-  
| 2011 ||  || 42
| 11 || 3 || 1 || 74 || 64 || 138 || 31 || 9 || 0.3 || 0.1 || 6.7 || 5.8 || 12.5 || 2.8 || 0.8 || 0
|-
| 2012 ||  || 42
| 19 || 5 || 1 || 129 || 79 || 208 || 39 || 60 || 0.3 || 0.1 || 6.8 || 4.2 || 10.9 || 2.1 || 3.2 || 0
|-  
| 2013 ||  || 42
| 24 || 13 || 9 || 182 || 123 || 305 || 51 || 61 || 0.5 || 0.4 || 7.6 || 5.1 || 12.7 || 2.1 || 2.5 || 0
|-
| 2014 ||  || 42
| 22 || 4 || 6 || 195 || 113 || 308 || 64 || 31 || 0.2 || 0.3 || 8.9 || 5.1 || 14.0 || 2.9 || 1.4 || 0
|-  
| 2015 ||  || 42
| 22 || 9 || 3 || 239 || 175 || 414 || 107 || 24 || 0.4 || 0.1 || 10.9 || 8.0 || 18.8 || 4.9 || 1.1 || 2
|-
| 2016 ||  || 42
| 22 || 6 || 5 || 275 || 168 || 443 || 80 || 48 || 0.3 || 0.2 || 12.5 || 7.6 || 20.1 || 3.6 || 2.2 || 0
|- 
| 2017 ||  || 2
| 25 || 3 || 3 || 375 || 240 || 615 || 115 || 45 || 0.2 || 0.3 || 15.0 || 9.6 || 24.6 || 4.6 || 1.8 || 2
|-
| 2018 ||  || 2
| 23 || 10 || 3 || 336 || 168 || 504 || 117 || 29 || 0.4 || 0.1 || 14.6 || 7.3 || 21.9 || 5.1 || 1.3 || 0
|-  
| 2019 ||  || 2
| 18 || 3 || 10 || 252 || 98 || 350 || 78 || 17 || 0.2 || 0.6 || 14.0 || 5.4 || 19.4 || 4.3 || 0.9 || 0
|-
| 2020 ||  || 2
| 19 || 8 || 8 || 234 || 82 || 316 || 74 || 17 || 0.4 || 0.4 || 12.3 || 4.3 || 16.6 || 3.9 || 0.9 || 0
|-  
| 2021 ||  || 2
| 21 || 11 || 8 || 326 || 155 || 481 || 112 || 26 || 0.5 || 0.4 || 15.5 || 7.4 || 22.9 || 5.3 || 1.2 || 4
|-  
| scope=row bgcolor=F0E68C | 2022# ||  || 2
| 24 || 9 || 6 || 351 || 169 || 520 || 120 || 44 || 0.4 || 0.3 || 14.6 || 7.0 || 21.7 || 5.0 || 1.8 || 5
|- class=sortbottom
! colspan=3 | Career
! 250 !! 87 !! 68 !! 2968 !! 1634 !! 4602 !! 988 !! 411 !! 0.3 !! 0.3 !! 11.9 !! 6.5 !! 18.4 !! 4.0 !! 1.6 !! 13
|}

Notes

Honours and achievements
Team
 AFL premiership player: 2022
 2× McClelland Trophy: 2019, 2022

Individual
All Stars Representative Honours in Bushfire Relief Match: 2020
 3× Ireland international rules football team: 2011, 2013, 2017

See also
 List of Carlton Football Club players
 List of Geelong Football Club players
 List of players who have converted from one football code to another

References

External links

1989 births
Living people
VFL/AFL players born outside Australia
Irish emigrants to Australia
Gaelic footballers who switched code
Irish international rules football players
Irish players of Australian rules football
Laois inter-county Gaelic footballers
Portlaoise Gaelic footballers
Carlton Football Club players
Preston Football Club (VFA) players
Geelong Football Club players
Geelong Football Club Premiership players
Sportspeople from County Laois
Irish expatriate sportspeople in Australia
One-time VFL/AFL Premiership players